West Elgin is a municipality in Elgin County, Ontario, Canada. The township was created on January 1, 1998, through the amalgamation of the former township of Aldborough with the village of West Lorne.

Communities
The two main population centres within the township are Rodney and West Lorne. Additionally, it also includes the smaller communities of Churchville, Clachan, Ferndell, Crinan, Eagle, Kintyre, New Glasgow, Port Glasgow and Twin Valleys.

History

The original township of Aldborough was named in 1792 after Aldeburgh, Suffolk, England.

The community of Rodney was originally named Stewart's Mills after the owner of the first sawmill in the community.  From 1840 to 1865, it was called Centreville due to its central location at the intersection of Furnival Road and 7th Concession (now Downie Line).  In 1865, the community was renamed Rodney after British naval officer George Brydges Rodney.  The centre of the village was relocated three kilometres to the south when the Canada Southern Railway was built in the area in 1872.

The community of West Lorne also had its origins the Canada Southern Railway.  Originally named Bismarck after the German chancellor, the community was renamed West Clayton, Dutton, Lorne and finally West Lorne.  The name came from the Lorne Mills on the south side of the railway, themselves named for John Campbell, Marquess of Lorne.  The station itself was renamed West Lorne in 1907 to avoid confusion with a community named Bismarck in Lincoln County.

The villages of Rodney and West Lorne were incorporated as municipalities in 1907 and 1908 respectively, and separated from the township. Subsequently, Aldborough remained a mainly rural municipality.

In 1994, Aldborough and Rodney amalgamated to form an expanded Township of Aldborough.  In 1998, Aldborough amalgamated with West Lorne to form West Elgin.

Climate

Demographics 

Infrastructure

West Lorne is home to western Elgin County's only high school, West Elgin Secondary School.

West Elgin Secondary school draws in students from West Elgin as well as Middlesex County. The school's mascot is a wildcat and their official colours are white and purple.

West Lorne is linked by Elgin County Road 76 to the 401, a major arterial highway link in Ontario affording easy access to Windsor, Chatham, St. Thomas, London, Brantford, Toronto, and many other places.

Local agriculture includes dairy farming, mixed farming, fruit growing and a sizeable tobacco industry.  The town of West Lorne was greatly influenced by the railroad that crossed through the heart of the village. The railroad provided jobs for the first residents of the area.  There is also some light manufacturing in the town.

Notable attractions
 Ontario has had some historical claimants, by towns, for the smallest jailhouse in the province. These have included: Tweed, Coboconk and Creemore. However, the jailhouse in Rodney has proven to be smaller than all three, measuring in at 4.5 metres by 5.4 metres. Today, it serves as a part-time tourist information centre. Other villages in Ontario with similar jailhouse dimensions include Port Dalhousie, Providence Bay, and the ghost town of Berens River and Ray.

Notable people
Bo Horvat, centre for the New York Islanders and former captain of the Vancouver Canucks
Travis Konecny, centre for the Philadelphia Flyers
Justin Azevedo, hockey player for Ak Bars Kazan (KHL)

See also
List of townships in Ontario

References

External links

Lower-tier municipalities in Ontario
Municipalities in Elgin County
1998 establishments in Ontario